A certificate of identity, sometimes called an alien's passport, is a travel document issued by a country to non-citizens (also called aliens) residing within their borders who are stateless persons or otherwise unable to obtain a passport from their state of nationality (generally refugees). Some states also issue certificates of identity to their own citizens as a form of emergency passport or otherwise in lieu of a passport. The visa requirements of certificates of identity may be different from those of regular passports.

Types

1951 Convention documents (for refugees) 
A certificate of identity issued to a refugee is also referred to as a 1951 Convention travel document (also known as a refugee travel document or a Geneva passport), in reference to the 1951 Convention Relating to the Status of Refugees. 145 countries are parties to the 1951 Convention and 146 countries are parties to the 1967 Protocol Relating to the Status of Refugees. Notably, the United States is not a party to the Convention, but provides travel documents to its lawful permanent residents, either as a Re-entry Permit or a refugee travel document under the 1967 Protocol.

1954 Convention documents (for stateless persons) 
A certificate of identity issued to a stateless person is also referred to as a 1954 Convention travel document, in reference to the 1954 Convention Relating to the Status of Stateless Persons. 89 countries are parties to the 1954 Convention.

Unlike a refugee travel document, a certificate of identity issued by most countries does not in itself entitle the holder to readmission into the country.

Non-Convention travel documents
Non-Convention (or non-National) travel documents are travel documents issued by a country to non-citizen (also called alien) residents who do not have access to passport facilities from their own countries, are not recognized as either Convention refugees, and are not officially stateless under the 1954 Convention relating to the status of stateless persons (or the country they live in has not signed that convention). 

In these cases there is no formal international agreement to regulate the issue of travel documents to these people although most countries will issue their own version of a non-convention travel document to residents. These documents broadly meet ICAO standards for international identity documents. They are known variously as Alien's Passports in mainland Europe and Scandinavia and as a certificate of identity in the United Kingdom, Australia and Hong Kong.

National examples
Certificates of identity are issued under various names, including:
 Australia – Australian Certificate of Identity
 Brunei – Bruneian International Certificate of Identity
 Canada – Canadian Certificate of Identity
 Estonia – Estonian alien's passport
 Finland – Alien's Passport
 Hong Kong – Hong Kong Document of Identity for Visa Purposes
 before handover – Hong Kong Certificate of Identity
 India – Indian Identity Certificate
 Indonesia – 
 Japan – Japan Re-entry Permit
 Latvia – Non-citizens (Latvia)
 Macau – Macau Special Administrative Region Travel Permit
 before handover –  ('Passport for foreigners')
 Malaysia – Malaysian Certificate of Identity
 New Zealand – New Zealand Certificate of Identity
 Singapore – Singapore Certificate of Identity
 United Kingdom – British Certificate of Travel
 United States – U.S. Re-entry Permit

See also
 Refugee identity certificate
 Refugee travel document
 1954 Convention travel document
 1954 Convention Relating to the Status of Stateless Persons
 1961 Convention on the Reduction of Statelessness
 Nansen passport
 Travel document

References

External links
Travel documents Passport Canada
Certificate of identity Fijian embassy to the United States
Certificates of identity Legalization of Identity Certificate
Certificate of identity Malaysia
Refugee travel documents and certificates of identity New Zealand Dept. of Internal Affairs
Certificates of identity Singapore Immigration & Checkpoints Authority
Certificate of travel United Kingdom Home Office

International travel documents
Identity documents